Beta Lupi (Latinized from β Lupi) or Kekouan, is a star in the southern constellation of Lupus. It has an apparent visual magnitude of 2.7, making it readily visible to the naked eye.

Properties
The stellar classification of B2 III indicates this is a giant star. The effective temperature of the star's outer envelope is 24,090 K, giving it the blue-white hue of a B-type star. With an age of around 25 million years, it is near the end of its hydrogen phase, where hydrogen is fused into the element helium, and transferring into a red supergiant star. At about 8.8 solar masses, it may have enough mass to end its life as a Type II supernova, but there is the possibility of Beta Lupi becoming a white dwarf.

This is a multi-period Beta Cephei variable with a dominant oscillation period of 0.232 days. It is a proper motion member of the Upper Centaurus–Lupus sub-group in the Scorpius–Centaurus OB association, the nearest such co-moving association of massive stars to the Sun. Beta Lupi has a high proper motion of more than 50 mas per year, suggesting a significant transverse velocity.

It is positioned about 1.3° SSW of the supernova remnant SN 1006.

Name
From the French rendering of this Chinese name derives the traditional European name Kekouan (Ke Kwan).

See also 
 Traditional Chinese star names#Lupus

References

External links

B-type giants
Upper Centaurus Lupus

Lupus (constellation)
Lupi, Beta
Durchmusterung objects
132058
073273
5571